Ulassai (Ulassa in Sardinian language)  is a comune (municipality) in the Province of Nuoro in the Italian region Sardinia, located about  northeast of Cagliari and about  southwest of Tortolì.

Ulassai borders the following municipalities: Esterzili, Gairo, Jerzu, Osini, Perdasdefogu, Seui, Tertenia, Ussassai, Villaputzu.

References

Cities and towns in Sardinia